"Goodbye" is a song by American singer Jason Derulo and French music producer David Guetta featuring vocals from Nicki Minaj and Willy William. It was adapted and written by Guetta, Philippe Greiss, William, David Saint Fleur, Art Beatz, Curtis Gray, Jean-Michel Sissoko, Dj Paulito, Jazelle Rodriguez, Christopher Tempest, Kinda Ingrosso, Minaj, Derulo, Francesco Sartori, Lucio Quarantotto and Franck Peterson. The latter three are credited due to the inclusion of elements of their composition "Time to Say Goodbye", as performed by Sarah Brightman and Andrea Bocelli. "Goodbye" is included on Guetta's seventh studio album, 7 (2018).

The song debuted on 23 August 2018, and was released a day later by both Guetta and Derulo's record labels – What a Music, Parlophone, Beluga Heights and Warner Bros. Records respectively. It is the sixth single from Guetta's 7 album  and was unveiled alongside another single from Guetta called "Drive" with Black Coffee and featuring Delilah Montagu.

Background 
On August 24, 2018, Guetta unveiled the sixth and seventh singles from his seventh album 7 (2018), "Goodbye" and then also "Drive" (with Black Coffee featuring Delilah Montagu). "Goodbye" is a collaboration with US R&B singer Jason Derulo and features Trinidadian-American rapper Nicki Minaj, as well as French musician and DJ Willy William. Guetta and Minaj have previously collaborated four times, beginning in 2011 with "Where Them Girls At" (also featuring Flo Rida) and "Turn Me On", both taken from Guetta's fifth album Nothing but the Beat. In 2015 they collaborated on "Hey Mama" (also featuring Bebe Rexha and Afrojack) for his sixth album Listen (2014). In 2017, they released the collaboration "Light My Body Up" (also featuring Lil Wayne). Meanwhile, Minaj and Derulo first collaborated in 2010 when she featured on the remix to his single "In My Head", taken from Derulo's debut self-titled studio album. They reunited in 2017 for the collaboration "Swalla" (also featuring Ty Dolla $ign).

The song's lyric video was released alongside the song's announcement. It features on Guetta's album 7 as track number six. "Goodbye" samples "Time to Say Goodbye" by Italian opera singer Andrea Bocelli. The official music video was released on October 21, 2018.

Live performances 
Guetta, Derulo and Minaj performed the song at the 2018 MTV Europe Music Awards.

Personnel 
Credits adapted from album booklet.

Phil Greiss – producer, engineer, keyboards, mastering, mixer, recording
David Saint Fleur – producer
David Guetta – producer, DJ
Vodka – producer
Kat Dahlia – background vocals
Jazelle "JVZEL" Rodriguez – background vocals
Ludovic Mullor – engineer
Ben Hogarth – engineer
Aubry "Big Juice" Delaine – engineer
Luca Pretolesi – mastering, mixing
Jason Derulo – vocals
Nicki Minaj – vocals
Willy William – vocals

Charts

Weekly charts

Year-end charts

Certifications

Release history

References

2018 songs
2018 singles
David Guetta songs
Jason Derulo songs
Nicki Minaj songs
Willy William songs
Songs written by David Guetta
Songs written by Francesco Sartori
Songs written by Jason Derulo
Songs written by Lucio Quarantotto
Songs written by Nicki Minaj
Songs written by Kinnda
Song recordings produced by David Guetta
Songs about parting